Mary Orr (born September 17, 1996) is a Canadian pair skater. With former partner Phelan Simpson, she finished in the top ten at the 2014 and 2015 World Junior Championships.

Career
Orr started learning to skate in 2000. She trained as a single skater at the Brantford Skating Club before moving to the Kitchener-Waterloo Skating Club, where she began skating pairs. In January 2013, she and Anthony Furiano became the Canadian junior bronze medalists for the second year in a row.

Orr teamed up with Phelan Simpson in 2013. The pair won the junior bronze medal at the 2014 Canadian Championships. They were assigned to the 2014 World Junior Championships in Sofia, Bulgaria, where they finished sixth.

Orr/Simpson won the national junior title at the 2015 Canadian Championships and were named in Canada's team to the 2015 World Junior Championships in Tallinn, Estonia, where they finished tenth. After the event, Simpson retired from competitive skating. Orr teamed up with Brett Varley in 2016.

Orr has also competed in running, mainly in 5 kilometre races.

Programs 
(with Simpson)

Competitive highlights 
JGP: Junior Grand Prix

With Simpson

With Furiano

References

External links 

 

1996 births
Canadian female pair skaters
Living people
Sportspeople from Burlington, Ontario